The Gran Premio Seleccion is a Grade-1 horse race open to international horses in Argentina. The race takes place in October at the Hipódromo Argentino de Palermo. The race is sometimes known as the Argentine Oaks.

Records since 1988 
Speed record:

 1:59.90 – Blue Baby Blue (1996)

Greatest margin of victory:

 13 lengths – Rafaga (1989)
 12 lengths – La Francesca (1991)
 11 lengths – Balada Sale (2011)

Most wins by a jockey:

 4 – Jorge Valdivieso (1995, 2000, 2004, 2005)
 4 – Pablo Gustavo Falero (1997, 2001, 2002, 2011)
 4 – Juan Carlos Noriega (2007, 2012, 2018, 2021)
 3 – Edwin Rafael Talaverano Cardenas (2006, 2009, 2010)

Most wins by a trainer:

 4 – Juan Carlos H. Etchechoury (2003, 2004, 2010, 2013)
 3 – Juan Carlos Maldotti (1997, 2001, 2002)
 3 – Juan Sebastian Maldotti (2007, 2011, 2012)

Most wins by an owner: 

 8 – Haras Vacación (1988, 1989, 1995, 1997, 2001, 2002, 2011, 2012)
 4 – Haras Firmamento (2003, 2006, 2009, 2010)

Most wins by a breeder:

 6 – Haras Vacación (1988, 1997, 2001, 2002, 2011, 2012)
 4 – Haras Firmamento (2003, 2006, 2009, 2010)

Winners since 1988

Earlier Winners 

 1893: Etoile
 1894: Porteña
 1895: Rose Royale
 1896: Colombia
 1897: Tarantula
 1898: Friolera*
 1898: Espina*
 1899: Parva
 1900: Fantasia
 1901: Cina Cina
 1902: Partícula
 1903: Breva
 1904: Rosette
 1905: Primera Tiple
 1906: Droga
 1907: Rangacua
 1908: Rubicela
 1909: Casiopea
 1910: Locandiera
 1911: Pirita
 1912: Brilla*
 1912: Flying Star*
 1913: Indiecita
 1914: Avicenia
 1915: Ocurrencia
 1916: Cantaridina
 1917: Divinidad
 1918: Omega
 1919: Cartagena
 1920: Democracia
 1921: Lye
 1922: Pilmayquen
 1923: La Patria
 1924: Sarcastica
 1925: Nena
 1926: Villanita
 1927: La Cloche
 1928: Monsega
 1929: Salmuera*
 1929: Catarata*
 1930: Aimara
 1931: Cote d'Or
 1932: Fe Ciega
 1933: Nudite
 1934: Black Arrow
 1935: Hear
 1936: Eida
 1937: Hulla
 Not run in 1938
 1939: Heil (previously known as Yamile)
 1940: Judea
 1941: Blackie
 1942: Dalilah
 1943: Platería
 1944: True Lady
 1945: Miss Grillo
 1946: Pinturera
 1947: Bullanquera
 1948: Empeñosa
 1949: White Milk
 1950: Foxona
 1951: Duty
 1952: Jubilosa
 1953: Siderea
 1954: Nyleptha
 1955: Ansiedad
 1956: Yauca
 1957: Carlinga
 1958: Pensilvania
 1959: Frisky
 1960: Cantadora
 1961: Pasión
 1962: Contrabrava
 1963: Argentaria
 1964: Luanda
 1965: Sweet Sue
 1966: Tebas
 1967: Rafale
 1968: Farm
 1969: La Sevillana
 1970: Olvida
 1971: Jungle Duchess
 1972: Sena
 1973: Bola de Cristal
 1974: Contraventora
 1975: Maia
 1976: Surera
 1977: Mía
 1978: Seed
 1979: Love's Hope
 1980: Tangaroa
 1981: Almira
 1982: Miss Keat
 1983: Goldenley
 1984: So Flag
 1985: Agigantada
 1986: Hanzacal
 1987: Abloom

*Dead heats occurred in 1898 (between Friolera and Espina), 1912 (between Brilla and Flying Star), 1929 (Salmuera and Catarata)

References

External links
 Official site

Horse races in Argentina